The 2013 Budweiser Duels were a pair of NASCAR Sprint Cup Series stock car races that were held on February 21, 2013, at Daytona International Speedway in Daytona Beach, Florida. Both contested over 60 laps, were the qualifying races for the 2013 Daytona 500.  The first race was won by Kevin Harvick for the Richard Childress Racing team. Greg Biffle finished second, while Juan Pablo Montoya, Jimmie Johnson, and Kurt Busch rounded out the top five. Afterward, the second race was won by Kyle Busch. Kasey Kahne followed in the second position, while Austin Dillon, Clint Bowyer, and Matt Kenseth rounded out the top five.

Report

Background

Daytona International Speedway is one of  six  superspeedways to hold NASCAR races, the others being Michigan International Speedway, Auto Club Speedway, Indianapolis Motor Speedway, Pocono Raceway and Talladega Superspeedway. The track's turns are banked at 31 degrees, while the front stretch, the location of the finish line, is banked at 18 degrees.

Races

Race 1
In the first Duel, consisting of cars that had qualified in an odd-numbered position, 2011 Daytona 500 winner Trevor Bayne dominated the race until Denny Hamlin lost control of his car on lap 53, crashing into Montoya, Edwards, and Bayne, ending their races. After the caution and green flag pit stops. Kevin Harvick took over the race lead and captured the first Duel, with Scott Speed taking the transfer spot. Brian Keselowski would be the only car in the first Duel that failed to qualify.

Race 2
The second duel was dominated by Jeff Gordon. With no cautions, Kyle Busch took the lead after crew chief Dave Rogers made the call to take only fuel. Busch would hold off Kasey Kahne and Austin Dillon to take his second Duel win. Mike Bliss was the second driver to miss the Daytona 500 after getting a window net penalty early.

Results

Qualifying 1

Race results 1

Qualifying 2

Race results 2

References

Budweiser Duels
Budweiser Duels
Budweiser Duels
NASCAR races at Daytona International Speedway